Dowlatkhaneh (also Romanized as Dowlatkhāneh, Dowlat Khāneh and Daulat Khāneh) is a village in Dowlatkhaneh Rural District, Bajgiran District, Quchan County, Razavi Khorasan Province, Iran. At the 2006 census, its population was 237, in 59 families.

References 

Populated places in Quchan County